Case Lake may refer to:
Case Lake, a lake in Lac qui Parle County, Minnesota
Case Lake, a lake in Watonwan County, Minnesota
Lac de la Case, a lake in Haute-Savoie, France
Case Lake, a lake near Cochrane, Ontario